Eugene Shalit (born March 25, 1926) is an American retired journalist, television personality, film and book critic, and author. After starting to work part-time on NBC's The Today Show in 1970, he filled those roles from January 15, 1973, until retiring on November 11, 2010. He is known for his frequent use of puns, his oversized handlebar moustache and fuzzy hair, and for wearing colorful bowties.

Early life and education
Shalit was born in New York City and raised in Newark and Morristown, New Jersey. In high school he wrote a humor column for the school newspaper, which Gannett has identified as "The Korn Krib". Shalit is of Jewish ancestry.

Shalit wrote for The Daily Illini for six years at the University of Illinois at Urbana–Champaign (1943–1949).

Career
Shalit, according to a New York Times Magazine interview of Dick Clark, was Clark's press agent in the early 1960s. Shalit reportedly "stopped representing" Clark during a Congressional investigation of payola. Clark never spoke to Shalit again, and referred to him as a "jellyfish".

Shalit has been involved in reviewing the arts since 1967 and has written for such publications as Look magazine, Ladies' Home Journal (for 12 years), Cosmopolitan, TV Guide, Seventeen, Glamour, McCall's, and The New York Times. From 1970 to 1982, he broadcast a daily essay on NBC Radio "Man About Anything", that was carried on more stations than any other NBC network radio feature.

In 1986, Shalit hosted a videocassette and laserdisc collection from MCA Home Video, Gene Shalit's Critic's Choice Video. Four images (five on the laserdisc covers) of Shalit appeared in a filmstrip on the front of the box with his reviews on the back. Titles included Touch of Evil, Destry Rides Again, Double Indemnity and The Ipcress File.

Shalit announced that he would leave The Today Show after 40 years, effective November 11, 2010. He was quoted as saying "It's enough already", about his retirement. He has largely stayed out of the public eye since then, only appearing once for Willard Scott's retirement from NBC in 2015.

Brokeback Mountain review controversy
Shalit was criticized by the Gay and Lesbian Alliance Against Defamation (GLAAD) for his review of Brokeback Mountain in which he referred to Jake Gyllenhaal's character as a "sexual predator": GLAAD said Shalit's "baseless branding of Jack as a 'sexual predator' merely because he is romantically interested in someone of the same sex is defamatory, ignorant, and irresponsible" and that he "used the occasion to promote defamatory antigay prejudice to a national audience." His son Peter, who is gay, wrote a letter to GLAAD defending his father and said the organization had defamed him by "falsely accusing him of a repellent form of bigotry."

Written works
Shalit has written and edited various books.

Personal life
Shalit was married to Nancy Lewis from 1950 until her death from cancer in 1978. For much of his career he lived in Leonia, New Jersey, although  he was listed as a resident of Stockbridge, Massachusetts.

Nancy Lewis' and Gene Shalit's children include the artist and entrepreneur Willa Shalit. Another child is Peter Shalit, a physician and recognized authority on gay men's health and living with HIV.  Their daughter Emily died of ovarian cancer in November 2012.

Shalit crashed his car in Lenox, Massachusetts, on October 24, 2012, after falling asleep at the wheel. Misdemeanor charges of negligent driving to endanger were later dismissed after he agreed to stop driving until the dismissal, and to follow a "safety condition" approved by his attorney and the police chief.

Cameo appearances and popular culture 
Shalit guest-starred as the voice, and was portrayed in the form of a fish food critic named "Gene Scallop" in the SpongeBob SquarePants episode "The Krusty Sponge".

Shalit has been parodied in several episodes of Family Guy in cutaway gags, including "Brian Sings and Swings", "The Book of Joe", and "Big Man on Hippocampus".

Shalit also voiced a character portraying himself in three episodes of the animated series The Critic.

A Muppet character based on him appeared in The Muppet Show: Sex and Violence (1975).

Shalit was portrayed in two episodes of Saturday Night Live by Jon Lovitz, and later in nine episodes by Horatio Sanz in sketches and Weekend Update sequences.

Shalit was also portrayed on Second City Television several times by cast member Eugene Levy.

On Late Night with David Letterman Shalit had his head squashed between two giant comedy hammers during an interview with David Letterman.

References

External links
 
 Biography on MSNBC

1926 births
20th-century American Jews
20th-century American journalists
21st-century American Jews
21st-century American journalists
American film critics
American television reporters and correspondents
Jewish American journalists
Jewish American writers
American people of Russian-Jewish descent
Journalists from New Jersey
Living people
Morristown High School (Morristown, New Jersey) alumni
NBC News people
People from Berkshire County, Massachusetts
People from Leonia, New Jersey
People from Morristown, New Jersey
University of Illinois Urbana-Champaign alumni
Writers from New Jersey